Aparna Nair is an Indian actress, who appears in Malayalam cinema.

Biography
Aparna was introduced to cinema by the veteran Lohithadas in Nivedyam. After Nivedyam, she portrayed Panchali in the play Chayamukhi, which had Mohanlal and Mukesh in lead roles. Aparna portrayed Kaviyoor Ponnamma’s young version in the 2009 film Meghatheertham, opposite Manikuttan. . In Kayam, Aparna was Bala’s pair. In 2010, She acted in Cocktail.  Her debut Tamil debut was Edhuvum Nadakkum, directed by K. Mageshwaran.

She then acted in Beautiful, receiving accolades for her performance. Next she acted in Streetlight directed by Sankar, in which she played four roles. She also acted in movies such as Mallu Singh, Thattathin Marayathu, and in Joshiy’s Run Babby Run.

Filmography

References

External links
 Aparna Nair in MSI
 

Indian film actresses
Actresses in Tamil cinema
Actresses in Malayalam cinema
Living people
Actresses from Kerala
Year of birth missing (living people)
21st-century Indian actresses
Actresses in Telugu cinema